A Place to Call Home is an Australian television drama series created by Bevan Lee. It debuted on the Seven Network on 28 April 2013. Set against the backdrop of the post-war social change, it follows Sarah Nordmann (Marta Dusseldorp), who has returned to Australia after twenty years abroad to start a new life and ends up clashing with wealthy matriarch Elizabeth Bligh (Noni Hazlehurst).

The sixth and final season premiered on 19 August 2018.

Series overview

Episodes

Season 1 (2013)

Season 2 (2014–15)

Season 3 (2015)

Season 4 (2016)

Season 5 (2017)

Season 6 (2018)

Specials

References

External links 
 
 

Lists of Australian drama television series episodes